This is a list of properties and districts in Wilkes County, Georgia that are listed on the National Register of Historic Places (NRHP).

Current listings

|}

References

Wilkes
Wilkes County, Georgia